The Perth leadership outcome model is a leadership model that characterizes leaders by the financial outcome of their leadership. It was developed by E. Ted Prince over a four-year period.

Traditional approaches 

The traditional leadership models are based on either a personality or a behavioral/competency approach. The personality approach is rooted in the "Great Man" theories popular in the early 20th century. Research in this tradition sought to identify the personal qualities that distinguished leaders from followers or effective leaders from ineffective leaders.

The behavioral/competency approaches focus on individual managerial competencies.

Concepts

Historical development 
The PLOM is related to two intellectual precursors. The work by the German sociologist Max Weber, linked social and economic variables.

The other precursor is psychologist David McClelland.

References and further reading 
PLOM and Business Acumen

Prince, E. Ted The Three Financial Styles of Very Successful Leaders: Strategic Approaches to Identifying the Growth Drivers of Every Company, McGraw Hill, New York, August 2005.

Mihaela Popa Chraif, "Review of the Three Financial Styles of Very Successful Leaders", Europe's Journal of Psychology, February 2006, 
"The 3 Financial Styles of Very Successful Leaders", Business Book Review, 
International Leadership Association Newsletter, September 2005, p. 5. 
Harvard Business School Working Knowledge, November 7, 2005 
Bass, B. M. (1990). Bass and Stogdill’s handbook of leadership (3rd ed.) New York: Free Press.
McCelland, D. C. (1973). Testing for competence rather than for intelligence. American Psychologist, 28, 1–14 .
McClelland, D. C. (1961) The achieving society. Princeton: Van Nostrand.
Schacter, H., "'Financial signature' defines a leader", GlobeandMail.com, September 28, 2005 
International Leadership Association, Interview with E. Ted Prince on the Three Financial Styles of Very Successful Leaders, September 28, 2005 
Workopolis.com Business Journal, September 28, 2005 
Small, V. "What to Look for in an Effective Leader", Regent Recruitment Newsletter, vol. 6, Winter 2005 
Jacobs, M. "What is Your Financial Signature". Catalyst Magazine, July, 2005, 
Institute of Executive Development, June 23, 2005, Interview with Dr. E. Ted Prince, "The Three Financial Styles of Very Successful Leaders". 

Behavioral finance
Leadership